SWRD Ltd / Wright Karts is an English company founded by Simon Wright in 1978, manufacturing and racing racing kart chassis.

SWRD/Team Wright Karts have contested the ultra-competitive Junior/ICA/Formula A/Formula SuperA/KF1/KF2/KF3/KZ1/KZ2/Formula Super ICC and X30 World and European championships for over two decades.

SWRD Racing Engines is a subsidiary of Simon Wright Racing Developments and specialises in the tuning of kart racing engines. SWRD Racing Engines have been an Iame agent for over 20 years (the longest in the UK). They also rebuild and repair other makes and models of motors.

Formula One star and 2009 World champion Jenson Button spent much of his karting career with Simon Wright Racing Developments/Team Wright Karts.

Dan Wheldon, IRL (Indy Race League) champion 2005 & Indy 500 winner 2005 & 2011, also spent the vast majority of his karting career with Simon Wright Racing winning multiple British Championships along the way.

Other ex-drivers include:

David Coulthard - Formula 1 (7th position in all time point scorers) 2001 F1 Vice-Champion
Dario Franchitti - CART/2007 IndyCar Series Champion/NASCAR/American Le Mans Series/2007 BBC Scotland Sports Personality of the Year
Allan McNish - Formula 1(Renault)/American Le Mans Series Champion/Twice 24 Hours of Le Mans Champion
Tom Ferrier - British Touring Car/FIA European Touring Car/British GT Championship
Richard Bradley - Le Mans 24hr Champion (LMP 2 Class)/Super Formula Series
Jason Plato - 2001 BTCC champion
Mika Salo - Formula 1/GT2 class 24 Hours Le Mans Winner 2008
Justin Wilson - IndyCar Series/Champ Car/Formula One
Oliver Jarvis - 2005 McLaren Autosport Young Driver of The Year Award/A1 GP (Team GB)/DTM
Mike Conway - GP2/IndyCar Series
Jake Rosenzweig - GP2 series

In 2012 Team Wright karts were pleased to announce a partnership with Formula 1 World Champions, Redbull F1, to run the Official Redbull KF3 junior karting team. All of the Redbull KF3 drivers (Harrison Newey, Alex Gill & Rory Cuff) were using the "Wright Suzuka 3" chassis and Simon Wright Racing Developments tuned Iame Parilla motors, this was a combination that resulted in Wright Karts winning the 2012 KF3 British Championships with Alex Gill (Ahead of future F1 star George Russell). This is a partnership that continues to this day, with Wright Karts being the kart of choice when UK based Redbull athletes use karting as both one of their off-season training methods and driver development programs.

2014 saw Wright Karts produce their first "Race specific" chassis for the rapidly growing "Bambino" category. The introduction of the "Wright Centaur" proved to be a great hit with the chassis winning the Bambino British Open Championships - Piloted by Oakley Keightly. The chassis has since gone on to become the most successful kart in the UK Bambino class ever. In 2018 the Wright Karts produced the successor to the Centaur, the Minotaur, which picked up where the Centaur left off, winning major Championships in its debut year:

 2014 British Open Champion - Oakley Keightly
 2015 British Open Champion - Freddie Slater
 2015 BKC series Champion - Taylor Orridge
 2016 BKC series Champion - Monde Konini Jnr
 2016 MSA Series Champion - Monde Konini Jnr
 2017 British open Champion - Joseph Katsansonis
 2017 BKC Series Champion - Joseph Katsantonis
 2017 MSA Series Champion - Archie Clark
 2017 Bambino GP Champion - Riley Cranham
 2017 Bambino Scottish Champion - Zac Drummond]
 2017 Bambino (Iame Bambino) London Cup - Joseph Katsantonis
 2017 Bambino (Comer Bambino) London Cup - Lewis Islin
2018 BKC Winter GP Champion (Iame Bambino) - Jacob Ashcroft
2019 BKC Series Champion (Comer Bambino) Champion - Braith Murdock

For 2020 Wright Karts will introduce their brand new "Flag ship" Cadet Kart. The Wright Phoenix

External links
Wright Karts official website

Kart racing
Companies based in Cambridgeshire